The Third Revolution may refer to:
Constitutional Protection Movement,  the Third Chinese Revolution (1917-1922)
Left-wing uprisings against the Bolsheviks,  the Third Russian Revolution (1918-1923)
Green Revolution,  the Third Agricultural Revolution (1950-1970)
Digital Revolution,  the Third Industrial Revolution (1989-present)